Aduyevo is the name of several rural localities in Russia:
Aduyevo, Kaluga Oblast, a selo in Medynsky District of Kaluga Oblast
Aduyevo, Moscow Oblast, a village in Yermolinskoye Rural Settlement of Istrinsky District in Moscow Oblast;